Ada Gentile (born 26 July 1947) is an Italian pianist and composer.

Life
Ada Gentile was born in Avezzano and attended the Conservatorio di St. Cecilia in Rome, graduating in piano and composition. She then completed a graduate degree at the Accademia di Santa Cecilia with Goffredo Petrassi. She has lectured at Northwestern University, Juilliard School, Wayne State University, Columbia University, the University of Chicago and the University of California, Berkeley in the United States and also widely in Europe and Asia. She was Deputy Director of St. Cecilia Conservatory from 1999 to 2005, and has been instrumental in organizing a number of music festivals. Her works have been performed internationally.

Honors and awards
Gaudeamus prize 1982
ISCM Budapest prize 1986
ISCM Essen prize 1995
Cavaliere al merito of Italian Republic

Works
Selected works include:
Adagios for string orchestra (1993–94)
Adagio for a Summer for flute and strings (1998)
Concertante for flute, guitar and orchestra (1989)
Concerto for Clarinet and Orchestra (1995)
Concert ("Veni Lumen Cordis") for female voice (or B clarinet) and orchestra (1993)
Criptografia (Cryptography) for viola and chamber orchestra (1985)
Two Episodes for organ, orchestra and voice in echo (1988)
Flighty for orchestra (1982)
Around for flute, clarinet and viola (1984)
Insight for 2 violins and viola (1984)
Perviolasola for viola solo (1987)
Music Scene (1996)
Piccolo concerto for chamber orchestra (1995)
Shading for guitar and chamber orchestra (1988)
Veränderungen for symphony orchestra (1976)
Why Not? for orchestra (1985)
She Begged My Mother for orchestra and narrator (2000)

Discography
Gentile maintains an extended discography. Selected recording include:
La voce contemporanea in Italia, Vol. 2 - Audio CD (Nov. 14, 2006) by Ennio Morricone, Bruno Maderna, Ada Gentile, Carlo Mosso, et al.
Vittorio Fellegara: Requiem di Madrid, Die Irae, Notturno Ada Gentile: Criptografia, Shading - Audio CD by Ada Gentile, Vittorio Fellegara, Giulio Bertola, Lev Martkitz, et al.
Paesaggi Della Mente - Audio CD by Ada Gentile and Manuel Zurria - flute
Plot in Fiction - Audio CD (Aug. 27, 2002) by Enrico Correggia, Luca Francesconi, Giacinto Scelsi, Ada Gentile, et al.
Musica De Camera - Audio CD (Dec. 12, 1995)

References

External links
Official website

Italian women classical composers
Italian classical pianists
Italian women pianists
1947 births
Living people
Italian music educators
Italian classical composers
Accademia Nazionale di Santa Cecilia alumni
Academic staff of the Accademia Nazionale di Santa Cecilia
Pupils of Goffredo Petrassi
People from Avezzano
20th-century classical pianists
21st-century classical pianists
20th-century classical composers
21st-century classical composers
21st-century Italian musicians
20th-century Italian women
20th-century Italian composers
21st-century Italian composers
Women music educators
Women classical pianists
20th-century women composers
21st-century women composers
21st-century Italian women
20th-century women pianists
21st-century women pianists